Ankalagi may refer to the following places in Indian state of Karnataka:

Ankalagi, Bagalkot, a village in Bagalkot district
Ankalagi, Bijapur, a village in Bijapur district

See also
Ankalgi, a village in Gokak taluk, Belagavi district, Karnataka